Live From Austin, TX is a live album by Steve Earle. The album was recorded on 12 September 1986 and released in 2004.

Track listing
All songs written by Steve Earle unless otherwise noted.

"Sweet Little '66" - 2:51
"Goodbye's All We Got Left" - 3:29
"Guitar Town" - 2:35
"Hillbilly Highway" - 3:32
"Good Ol Boy (Gettin' Tough)" - 4:05 (Earle, Richard Bennett)
"My Old Friend the Blues" - 3:00
"Think It Over" - 2:32 (Earle, Richard Bennett)
"Little Rock 'N' Roller" - 5:58
"State Trooper" - 5:06 (Bruce Springsteen)
"Nowhere Road" - 2:57 (Earle, Reno Kling)
"The Week of Living Dangerously" - 4:41
"Angry Young Man" - 4:29 (Earle, John Porter McMeans)
"Fearless Heart" - 4:06
"I Love You Too Much" - 3:49
"San Antonio Girl" - 3:00
"The Devil's Right Hand" - 3:08
"Down the Road" - 3:07 (Earle, Tony Brown, Jimbeau Hinson)

Personnel
Steve Earle - guitar, vocals
Ken Moore - keyboards
Bucky Baxter - guitar
Ron Kling - bass guitar, keyboards
Harry Stinson - drums
Mike McAdam - guitar

References

Steve Earle live albums
2004 live albums
New West Records live albums
2004 video albums
New West Records video albums
Live video albums